Baba Kuhi of Shiraz (948 - 1037 CE) was a 10th- and 11th-century Persian Sufi mystic. Probably born in Shiraz (now in Southern Iran). As a young man he met the Arab poet Al-Mutanabbi and the well-known Sufi Abū ʿAbdallāh Moḥammad.

References

948 births
1037 deaths
Iranian Sufis
Iranian Sunni Muslims
Islamic philosophers
Persian spiritual writers
Burials in Iran
Sufi poets
Mystic poets
11th-century Persian-language poets
11th-century Islamic religious leaders
Iranian Sufi saints
10th-century Iranian philosophers
11th-century Iranian philosophers